La Plata is a station of the Seville Metro on the line 1. It is located at the intersection of Los Gavilanes Av. and Virgen de la Saleta St., in the neighborhood of Parque Amate. La Plata is an underground station, located between Amate and Cocheras on the same line. It was opened on 2 April 2009.

See also
 List of Seville metro stations

References

External links 
 Official site  
 History, construction details and maps

Seville Metro stations
Railway stations in Spain opened in 2009